Mark Steven Greenfield (born 1951, Los Angeles, California) is an African-American visual artist.

Early life and education
The son of a military man, Mark Steven Greenfield spent his early childhood in Germany and Taiwan. As an only child, Greenfield describes the challenges of being alone, "[a]s far as diversity," he says, "I was about it." Overseas, Greenfield developed a sense of uniqueness that he later describes as "transforming itself into strength in the face of adversity" when he returned to Los Angeles in 1960 at the age of ten. 

Reintegration into Los Angeles's African American culture proved difficult for many reasons, namely, because while Greenfield was overseas he had been spared the personal humiliation of racism. Returning at the height of the civil rights conflicts, Greenfield became newly acquainted with the experiences facing African American youth. It was also during this time that the artist's parents divorced, his father moving to Florida and his mother now faced with the challenges of having to support the two of them on her own.

As a child Greenfield attended an art program at the Otis Art Institute, sponsored by the Golden State Mutual Life Insurance Company, where he studied under Charles White and John Riddle. In high school Greenfield had shown some talent and interest in art. However, as a teenager coming of age in South Central Los Angeles, the artist often found himself in trouble. A favorite teacher, whom Greenfield credits with saving his life once remarked "you could be a pretty good artist if you live that long."

Greenfield's mother relocated to New York when he was eighteen, and the artist describes having only three options: Vietnam, college, or living with his grandmother. Having already developed a strong political voice against a war Greenfield describes as "unjust," Vietnam was quickly ruled out. College was his choice by default as "living with grandma would have been almost as bad as going to Vietnam," the artist remarks in an interview. Relying heavily on student loans, he attained his bachelor's degree in Art Education in 1973 from California State University, Long Beach. He attained his Master's of Fine Arts from California State University, Los Angeles in 1987. During college, Greenfield turned his energies and focus to African American Studies and immersed himself in campus life and activism.

Art and creative work
By 1969, relatively early in the artist's career, Greenfield had embraced art as a means of self-expression-- "I felt that many times with my father being so dominating, I had no chance to express my feelings...doing my art gave me a chance to express who I was." Despite defining himself as "an artist first," he has never rejected the label "African American artist." In fact, Greenfield has always "accepted it with pride." He remembers:

"As an undergraduate I was studying Art History and I was not thinking that this is 'white art.' I realized that these artists are just expressing things that are important to their experience. So if I choose to express things that are important to my experience why do I have to be penalized because it is 'ethnic'?"

Some work to follow this moment in school took him in the direction of genealogy. Specifically, The Banner Series (date) was structured based on banners that Greenfield has seen as a child in Taiwan, where banners with images of the deceased are carried during funeral processions. The images on this work are people from Greenfield's own family; however, the artist describes the message as a broader one:

"My genealogical research made me realize that all human families have a lot in common. In every family there is someone we are ashamed of, someone we are proud of, someone who is a failure and someone who is a great success."

In 2000, Greenfield dedicated himself to another important project, that of working through the history and cultural remnants of blackface minstrelsy. The point of this he said was to provoke dialogue. "It's important for a younger generation to know what happened. Now younger artists can take it up if they need to. I just hope I've helped create a coherent context," said Mark Steven Greenfield in a November 2014 L.A. Times interview. His Blackatcha (date) exhibitions exposed this painful legacy in American cultural memory.  "It is my hope that the work might offer a glimpse into the origins of some conscious and subconscious contemporary thinking with regard to race, color, and gender. If you are discomforted by what you see, I invite you to examine those feelings, for out of this examination with come enlightenment...My work entreats the viewer to look at these images, while at the same time looking through them, to discover an alternative context."

His minstrelsy characters instead of displaying looks of happiness often display looks of anger and rage.

Greenfield was a 2016 Artist-in-Residence at the McColl Center for Art + Innovation in Charlotte, NC. After a residency in Brazil in 2014 the focus of his work is now turning towards the topic of contemporary eguns.

Other work 
Throughout his career, Greenfield has had affiliations with no less than 25 associations and public service agencies. He has held the varied and esteemed titles of President; juror; instructor and mentor. He was the executive director of the Los Angeles Municipal Art Gallery for xx years. Greenfield describes his path to success as not paved with years spent in ivory towers, but with hard work at the grassroots level, "a commitment to better himself through bettering others."

Perhaps shockingly, Greenfield describes his best job as working as a janitor. "I worked with a friend cleaning office buildings at night. The job gave me peace and quiet-- it was a great time to think about your art work--  it was mindless work."

In 1986, Greenfield became the Founding Member of the Black Creative Professionals Association. In 1992, he served as President of the California African American Genealogical Society. Greenfield was on the Board of the Watts Village Theater Company; and he later worked as Art Center Director at the Watts Towers Arts Center as part of the Cultural Affairs Department of the City of Los Angeles. He also served on the Board of the Korean American Museum, was the vice president of the Los Angeles Art Association, and was on the board of the Downtown Arts Development Association.

Personal life 
Raised a Catholic (a theme that influences much of his artistic work), Greenfield lapsed as an adolescent and later became involved with Eastern religions.

Exhibitions

Sep, 2014 	Lookin’ Back in Front of Me: Selected Works of Mark Steven Greenfield, 1974-2014 	
California African American Museum

Sep, 2014 	EAT.DRINK.ART - A Kaleidoscope of the Senses 	
Los Angeles Municipal Art Gallery at Barnsdall Park (LAMAG)
 
Mar, 2014 	RISE: Love. Revolution. Black Panther Party. Closing Reception 	
Art Share L.A.
 
Feb, 2014 	RISE: Love, Revolution, the Black Panthers 	
Art Share L.A.
 
Sep, 2013 	Offramp Gallery - Fifth Anniversary Showcase 	
Offramp Gallery
 
Jun, 2013 	2013 Monster Drawing Rally 	
Armory Center for the Arts
 
Apr, 2013 	Mark Steven Greenfield: Closing Reception and Artist Talk 	
Offramp Gallery
 
Mar, 2013 	Wine Tasting with Mark Steven Greenfield and Colorado Wine Company 	
Offramp Gallery
 
Mar, 2013 	ONE SHOT : [SPACES] 	
The Loft at Liz's
 
Mar, 2013 	Writing Down the Bones / An Alchemy of Arts & Letters 	
California African American Museum
 
Mar, 2013 	Animalicious 	
Offramp Gallery 2013
 
Mar, 2013 	Wine Tasting with Mark Steven Greenfield and Colorado Wine Cmmpany 	
Offramp Gallery
 
Mar, 2013 	Mark Steven Greenfield: Animalicious 	
Offramp Gallery
 
Feb, 2013 	Democracy in Art and Life 	
Palos Verdes Art Center
 
Jan, 2013 	PRINT: DEMOCRACY IN ART AND LIFE 	
Palos Verdes Art Center
 
Nov, 2012 	Letters From Los Angeles: Text in Southern California Art 	
Jack Rutberg Fine Arts
 
Nov, 2012 	Underexposed 	
Center for the Arts, Eagle Rock
 
Nov, 2012 	From Bukowski to St. John the Evangelist 	
Avenue 50 Studio
 
Oct, 2012 	2012 C.O.L.A. Exhibition: Conversations with the Artists (October 19) 	
Los Angeles Municipal Art Gallery at Barnsdall Park (LAMAG)
 
Oct, 2012 	Go Tell it on the Mountain 	
California African American Museum
 
Sep, 2012 	2012 C.O.L.A. Individual Artist Fellowships Exhibition 	
Los Angeles Municipal Art Gallery at Barnsdall Park (LAMAG)
 
Sep, 2012 	Sea of Exchange: Ireland - Los Angeles 	
LA Print Space @ Pacific Design Center
 
Apr, 2012 	18th Street Arts Center's ArtNight 	
18th Street Arts Center
 
Apr, 2012 	Visions from the New California 	
18th Street Arts Center
 
May, 2011 	Doo-Dahz 	
Offramp Gallery 2011
 
May, 2011 	Doo-Dahz 	
Offramp Gallery
 
Dec, 2010 	Holiday Season Art Show 	
LA Artcore Brewery Annex
 
Nov, 2010 	inSCRIPTion: ... text ... image ... action ... 	
Cerritos College Art Gallery
 
Nov, 2010 	LATITUDE 34-40 	
Art 1307 Villa Di Donato
 
Sep, 2010 	Social/Political Content 	
José Drudis-Biada Art Gallery
 
Apr, 2010 	4TH INTERNATIONAL EXCHANGE SHOW WITH THAILAND 	
LA Artcore Union Center for the Arts
 
Mar, 2010 	4TH INTERNATIONAL EXCHANGE SHOW WITH THAILAND 	
LA Artcore Brewery Annex
 
Jan, 2010 	Spirituality in Art 	
Avenue 50 Studio
 
Dec, 2009 	Testimonies Two - Contemporary Ex-Votos 	
Avenue 50 Studio
 
Dec, 2009 	“Testimonies Two - Contemporary Ex-Votos” 	
Avenue 50 Studio
 
Nov, 2009 	Monster Drawing Rally 	
Center for the Arts, Eagle Rock
 
Aug, 2009 	A Collectors Tardeada 	
Avenue 50 Studio
 
Jul, 2009 	Othello's Ghost 	
Offramp Gallery
 
May, 2009 	COLA 2009 Individual Artist Fellowships Exhibition 	
Los Angeles Municipal Art Gallery at Barnsdall Park (LAMAG)
 
Apr, 2009 	"WEST SOUTHWEST: ABQ - LA EXCHANGE" 	
LA Artcore Brewery Annex
 
Apr, 2009 	"WEST SOUTHWEST: ABQ - LA EXCHANGE" 	
LA Artcore Union Center for the Arts
 
Feb, 2009 	Whim-Wham 	
Los Angeles Municipal Art Gallery at Barnsdall Park (LAMAG)
 
Aug, 2008 	Mammygraphs 	
Wignall Museum of Contemporary Art
 
Mar, 2008 	Film Screening and Discussion 	
Sweeney Art Gallery
 
Jan, 2008 	Incognegro: New Works by Mark Steven Greenfield 	
Sweeney Art Gallery
 
Sep, 2007 	Incognegro 	
18th Street Arts Center
 
Jul, 2001 	PIXX 	
Watts Towers Arts Center

References

1951 births
Living people
Artists from Los Angeles
California State University, Long Beach alumni
California State University, Los Angeles alumni
Former Roman Catholics